Amira Elmissiry, is a lawyer who works as the Chief Equity and Chief Catalytic Investment Officer, in the Private Sector Operations Division at the African Development Bank, based in Abidjan, in the Ivory Coast. She previously advised Donald Kaberuka, the former President of the bank.

Background and education
Elmissiry was admitted to Cardiff University in 2000 to study law. She graduated with a Bachelor of Laws (LLB) degree in 2004. Between 2004 and 2006, she studied at the Inns of Court School of Law (today, City Law School), where she attended the Bar Professional Training Course, and was called to the Bar in the United Kingdom in 2006. She continued her education at the City Law School, graduating in 2009 with a Master of Laws (LLM) degree in 2009, specializing in Restorative justice. In 2016 she enrolled in the African Leadership University, where she graduated with a Master of Business Administration (MBA) degree, in 2018.

Work experience
For a period of two years, from September 2005 until September 2007, she worked as the Programme Manager and Principal Researcher at a Non-governmental organization called Initiatives of Change International, where her work took her between London and Geneva. She also worked as a Project Manager and Human Rights Lecturer at the University of the Witwatersrand, as part of a project funded by the German Technical Cooperation and the Southern African Development Community called Drama for Life, from January 2007 until May 2008.

In August 2009, she was hired by the African Development Bank, in Tunis, Tunisia, as a young professional working with the Office of the Secretary General as Assistant to the Secretary General, until August 2010. She then was appointed as an Investment Officer in the Private Sector and Microfinance Operations Division of the bank, helping to establish the private equity practice of the Bank. She was then promoted to Senior Legal Counsel in private sector operations, serving in that capacity for nearly three years, until April 2014.

In April 2014 Elmissiry was transferred to Abidjan, Ivory Coast, and was appointed as a Special Assistant to the President of the African Development Bank, a position she occupied for nearly two years, until February 2016. In 2016, she was promoted to Chief Equity and Catalytic Investment Officer, Private Sector Operations at the bank. She occupies that position as of November 2016.

Other considerations
In 2014, she was named among "The 20 Youngest Power Women In Africa 2014", by Forbes Magazine
For five consecutive years, from 2015 until 2020, she was named by Choiseul 100 Africa as one of the Top 100 Economic Leaders of Africa. In 2017, she was named one of the 100 Global Most Influential People of African Descent Under 40 (MIPAD).

See also
 Adiat Disu
 Ada Osakwe
 Susan Oguya
 Hanan Morsy

References

External links
Website of the African Development Bank

1982 births
21st-century Zimbabwean lawyers
Zimbabwean women lawyers
Alumni of Cardiff University
Alumni of the Inns of Court School of Law
African Leadership University alumni
Living people